Taşköprü (translated to Stone bridge) is a combined regulator dam and bridge located in Beyşehir district of Konya Province, central Turkey.

It was constructed as a flood barrier as part of the irrigational Konya Plain Project on the ground of a ruined 8–10 arched bridge between 1908 and 1914. Its completion was delayed due to repeated flooding at the Lake Beyşehir. The dam was commissioned by Albanian Ottoman Grand Vizier Mehmed Ferid Pasha of Vlorë (in office 1903–1908),. Regulated water draining off the lake contributed to the rise of the formerly droughty and quaggy Konya Plain into a "granary".

Taşköprü is situated over the Beyşehir-Soğla-Apa Canal close to the Lake Beyşehir. The -long and -wide ashlar-masonry combined dam-bridge structure has two level of 15 arches and floodgates. The bridge was initially open to motorized traffic. After the building of a new road bridge west of it, Taşköprü is used today as a pedestrian bridge only.

With effect on July 12, 1980, the historic monumental structure was put under protection by the Cultural and Natural Heritage Protection Board.

References

Dams in Konya Province
Arch bridges in Turkey
Dams completed in 1914
Bridges completed in 1914
1914 establishments in the Ottoman Empire
Pedestrian bridges in Turkey
Beyşehir District
Ottoman bridges in Turkey
Stone bridges in Turkey